Robert Staddon (born ) was an English cricketer and rugby union footballer. He played cricket for Devon and rugby for Devon and Exeter. He was born in Exeter.

Staddon made a single List A cricketing appearance, in the 1969 Gillette Cup, against Hertfordshire. As an opener, he scored a single run in the only List A innings in which he batted.

Staddon represented Devon in the Minor Counties Championship between 1967 and 1976.

External links
Robert Staddon at CricketArchive 

1944 births
Living people
Cricketers from Exeter
Devon cricketers
English cricketers
English rugby union players
Rugby union players from Exeter